"Angel" is a song by Akon. The track was written by Akon, David Guetta and Sandy Wilhelm, and produced by David Guetta and Sandy Vee. The single was released to U.S. mainstream radio on September 14, 2010, before being released as a digital download on September 17. The single was released via worldwide digital download on November 7, 2010. The song peaked at number fifty-six on Billboard Hot 100. Akon performed the song during the 2010 Victoria's Secret Fashion Show, and it was also used in the Victoria's Secret 2011 Secret Angels commercial. The song was not released on any physical formats.

Charts

Certifications

References

2010 singles
Akon songs
Songs written by Akon
Songs written by David Guetta
Songs written by Sandy Vee
Song recordings produced by Sandy Vee
2010 songs
Song recordings produced by David Guetta